This is a list of species of plants having a specialized seed dispersal characteristic known as dehiscence in their  or plant genera where dehiscent fruit is a defining characteristic.

In order for plant species articles to be included in the list they should meet the following criteria :

 dehiscence in the fruit of the species is mentioned at least once;
 a citation makes explicit reference to the species having dehiscent fruit.

In order for plant genus articles to be included in the list they should meet the following criteria :

 dehiscence in the fruit of species of the genus is mentioned at least once;
 a citation which makes explicit reference to the said genus having dehiscent fruit;
 all or at least most of its species display dehiscence in their fruit.

see also : List of plants with indehiscent fruits

Aquilegia
Asclepias
Bulbophyllum
Coopernookia
Cynanchum
Darlingtonia californica
Dipodium
Drosera
Exochorda
Forstera
Franklinia
Genlisea
Gentianaceae
Heliamphora
Hesperis matronalis
Hesperoyucca
Hura crepitans
Kageneckia
Lindleya
Lunaria annua
Papaver
Peony
Phlox
Populus
Rorippa palustris
Sarracenia
Spiraea
Stylidium
Vauquelinia
Vella (plant)
Venus flytrap
Zuccagnia

Dehiscent fruits
dehiscent fruit